John Arbanas (born 7 February 1970) is an Australian former professional tennis player.

Arbanas, a Victorian, played mostly in satellite tournaments, but is notable for featuring in the main draw as a qualifier at the 1991 Australian Open. He had qualifying wins over Tim Wilkison, Mark Hopkins and Glenn Layendecker, then was beaten in the first round of the main draw by Brazilian player Jaime Oncins.

References

External links
 
 

1970 births
Living people
Australian male tennis players
Tennis people from Victoria (Australia)